Cathal Ainrí Ó Néill, or Charles Henry O'Neill, was the chieftain of the O'Neill dynasty of Clandeboye, (English - The O'Neill Clanaboy, Irish - Ó Néill Buidhe), from 1855 until his death in 1865.

The son of Felix-Cunningham O'Neill, Esq., and Mary O'Neill (daughter of Bernard O'Neill of Ballygrooby and Dunmore, and Mary, the daughter of John O'Neill, Esq. of Muinterevelin, County Tyrone), Charles Henry was a Dublin barrister, born at Feeva House in County Antrim near present-day Toomebridge on 25 December 1809. 

He married Mary Adeline Louise O'Grady, daughter of James O'Grady, Esq. professor of Hebrew and principal of the Seminary of Saint Patrick, and they had one child. He was the lineal descendant of the last Chieftain of Clanaboy, Brian mac Féilim Ó Néill, through Briain's son and the last Tanaiste of Clanaboy, Con mac Briain Ó Néill. His daughter Elizabeth Catherine Mary Theresa was the last O'Neill of the Feeva to be born at Drumderg House in 1845; near Carlane, which had been the home of this line since Con mac Briain's son, Hugh Óg Ó Néill, fought alongside Hugh O'Neill, Earl of Tyrone and was dispossessed of the majority of his estates, and forced to leave Eden-duff-carrick settled in the adjoining lordship, The Feeva.

From that time on Edendubhcarrig, later known as Shane's Castle, was in the hands of the descendants of Sir Henry Ó Néill, who had converted to Anglicanism and conformed in Elizabethan times. 

In 1855, on the death of John O'Neill, 3rd Viscount O'Neill, who was predeceased by his elder brother Charles O'Neill, 1st Earl O'Neill, Sir Henry O'Neill's will entailed the Shane's Castle estate on the descendants of Con mac Briain Ó Néill; an event which signified the extinction of issue of his daughter Rose and heirs male in his own line. 

In a matter of great dispute, while Charles Henry became recognised as The O'Neill Clanaboy, John O'Neill, 3rd Viscount O'Neill was able to supersede the will by which he had inherited himself, and leave the Shane's Castle estate by his own will to William Chichester, who assumed the surname O'Neill and became William O'Neill, 1st Baron O'Neill.

Elizabeth married the Judge James Gervé Conroy and migrated to St. John's, Newfoundland in 1872, where their Dublin born son Charles O'Neill Conroy grew up.

Further reading 

O'Neill dynasty
1809 births
1865 deaths